Niemierzyn may refer to the following places in Poland:
Niemierzyn, Szczecin
Niemierzyn, Łódź Voivodeship